Brad Long (born June 14, 1962) is an American motivational speaker, former actor, and former college athlete.

Education 
Long played college basketball for the Southwestern Moundbuilders. Long graduated from Southwestern College in 1985, where he earned a Bachelor of Business Administration.

Career 
Long is best known for his role in the 1986 film Hoosiers, where he portrayed the character of basketball team captain "Buddy" Walker. Long did not pursue a career in acting after Hoosiers, and later became a motivational speaker. Long is also a church deacon. Long was featured in the May 2004 issue of Indianapolis Monthly after it was believed that he had appeared in an erotic B-movie called Exit. It was later discovered that the actor in the film was another Brad Long.

Long has toured the country as a speaker, visiting schools and sports teams. Long has also been featured on The Dan Patrick Show and WROK-AM.

Long now works as a sales representative for Jostens.

Personal life 
Long and his wife, Lisa, reside in Whiteland, Indiana. He has two children, Shelby and Landry.

References

External links
 

Living people
Southwestern Moundbuilders men's basketball players
American male film actors
20th-century American male actors
American men's basketball players
1962 births